Warriors of the Dawn (RR: Daeripgun) is a 2017 South Korean historical film by Jeong Yoon-cheol set during the 1592 Imjin War, starring Lee Jung-jae and Yeo Jin-goo. The story follows a group of mercenaries tasked with protecting the newly crowned prince Gwanghae during a long and treacherous journey vital to the country’s future. The film was released on May 31, 2017.

Plot 
To avoid invading Japanese forces, King Seonjo escapes to the Ming Empire and abandons his people in the process. In his place, Prince Gwanghae (Yeo Jin-goo) leads the royal court and confronts the enemies with the help of proxy soldiers led by To-woo (Lee Jung-jae). Proxy soldiers consist of those who are paid to serve in the military on behalf of others.

Cast
Lee Jung-jae as To-woo
Yeo Jin-goo as Prince Gwanghae
Kim Mu-yeol as Gok-soo 
Park Won-sang as Jo-seung
Esom as Duk-yi 
Bae Soo-bin as Yang-sa 
Kim Myung-gon as Jung Pan-seo
Park Hae-joon as Tarobe
Oh Kwang-rok as Pockmark
Cho Dong-in as Soi-dol
Park Ji-hwan as Gorruta

Production 
The filming began on September 5, 2016 and wrapped up on January 10, 2017. The original English title for the movie was The Proxy Soldiers before it was officially changed to Warriors of the Dawn.

Awards and nominations

References

External links 
 Warriors of the Dawn at HanCinema

2017 films
South Korean historical action films
South Korean political films
Films about politicians
Films about the Japanese invasions of Korea (1592–1598)
Films set in the 1590s
Films set in the Joseon dynasty
20th Century Fox films
Political action films
Historical action films
2010s South Korean films